Pl@ntNet is a citizen science project for automatic plant identification through photographs and based on machine learning.

History
This project launched in 2009 has been developed by scientists (computer engineers and botanists) from a consortium gathering French research institutes (Institut de recherche pour le développement (IRD), Centre de coopération internationale en recherche agronomique pour le développement (CIRAD), Institut national de la recherche agronomique (INRA), Institut national de recherche en informatique et en automatique (INRIA) and the network Tela Botanica, with the support of Agropolis Fondation 
).

Platforms
An app for smartphones (and a web version) was launched in 2013, which allows to identify thousands of plant species from photographs taken by the user. It is available in several languages.

As of 2019 it had been downloaded over 10 million times, in more than 180 countries worldwide.

Projects
In 2019, Pl@ntNet has 22 projects:

References

Botany
Citizen science
Biology websites
Internet properties established in 2009